Borsonella bartschi is a species of sea snail, a marine gastropod mollusk in the family Borsoniidae.

Description
The solid shell is white, covered with a pale straw-colored periostracum. It contains eight whorls exclusive of the (lost) nucleus. The suture is distinct with a slightly swollen margin. The axial sculpture consists of (on the penultimate whorl about nine) nodular ribs, peripheral on the spire, becoming obsolete on the body whorl, beginning in front of the fasciole and obscure beyond the periphery. The spiral sculpture consists of fine striae, visible only in occasional spots. The fasciole is somewhat constricted. Beside this there are faint traces of vermicular sculpture visible under a glass, reminiscent of the sculpture in Borsonella barbarensis. The aperture is narrow. The anal sulcus is moderately deep. The thin outer lip is arcuate. The body and the columella are smooth.  The plait is hidden behind the columella which is attenuate in front. The siphonal canal is short and wide.

The height of shell attains 22 mm ; of the body whorl: 13 mm: diameter: 8 mm.

Distribution
This species occurs in the Pacific Ocean off Santa Barbara Island, California.

References

 Tucker, J.K. 2004 Catalog of recent and fossil turrids (Mollusca: Gastropoda). Zootaxa 682:1–1295.
 McLean J.H. (1996). The Prosobranchia. In: Taxonomic Atlas of the Benthic Fauna of the Santa Maria Basin and Western Santa Barbara Channel. The Mollusca Part 2 – The Gastropoda. Santa Barbara Museum of Natural History. volume 9: 1–160

External links
 

bartschi
Gastropods described in 1903